The 2007–08 Liga de Honra season was the 18th season of the competition and the 74th season of recognised second-tier football in Portugal. The season was started on 18 August 2007. The fixtures (or schedule of games to be played) were announced on 12 July 2007.

Fátima and Freamunde were promoted to the Liga Vitalis.

The first goalscorer of the season was Tatu, who scored a 4th-minute goal for Desportivo das Aves against Olhanense in, one of the four games, the kick-off that ended 1–2 for Olhanense. The first red card of the season was given to Desportivo das Aves' Sérgio Nunes  in the same game.

Teams

Final standings

Results

References

External links
Calendar of the Portuguese League
Season on soccerway.com

Liga Portugal 2 seasons
Port
2007–08 in Portuguese football leagues